The 3rd Engineer Regiment is a military engineer regiment of the Italian Army based in Udine in Friuli Venezia Giulia. Today the regiment is the engineer unit of the Cavalry Brigade "Pozzuolo del Friuli".

History 
On 1 October 1922 the 2nd Army Corps Engineer Grouping was formed in Lodi, which received the Sappers Battalion and the Telegraphers Battalion of the III Army Corps, and a miners company from the disbanded Miners Engineer Regiment. The grouping consisted of a command, a sappers-miners battalion, a telegraphers battalion, a photo-electricians company, three dovecotes (in Aosta, Brescia, and Milan), and a depot. In 1923 the grouping moved to Pavia. On 1 November 1926 the grouping was renamed 3rd Engineer Regiment. On 1 February 1931 the regiment formed a Miners-Cableway Battalion, which was transferred on 28 October 1932 to the newly formed 1st Miners Regiment in Novi Ligure. On the same day the regiment received the II Battalion of the disbanded 2nd Radio-Telegraphers Regiment.

On 1 October 1934 the regiment merged with the Engineer Arm's Complementary Officer Cadets School and was renamed 3rd Engineer School Regiment. The regiment now consisted of a command, a cadets battalion, a mixed engineer battalion (with sappers, engineer, cableway, and photo-electricians companies), a teleradio battalion, dovecotes (in Brescia, and Milan), and a depot. On the same day the regiment transferred the radio-telegraphers battalion to the 4th Engineer Regiment.

For the Second Italo-Ethiopian War the regiment formed a water company, four water platoons, an engineer company for CC.NN. division, and a workers platoon, which on 20 January 1936 joined the 9th Engineer Regiment.

On 15 September 1937 the school split from the regiment and formed the Engineer Complementary Officer Cadets School. The 3rd Engineer Regiment consisted now of a command, a sappers-engineer battalion, a connections battalion, a mixed engineer battalion for motorized division, two dovecotes, and a depot.

World War II 
With the outbreak of World War II the regiment's depot began to mobilize new units:

 Command of the 2nd Special Army Engineer Grouping (for service in the North African Campaign)
 II Army Mixed Engineer Battalion
 XXXIII Mixed Engineer Battalion (for the 133rd Armored Division "Littorio")
 LII Mixed Engineer Battalion (for the 101st Motorized Division "Trieste")
 CXXXIV Mixed Engineer Battalion (for the 134th Armored Division "Emanuele Filiberto Testa di Ferro", later renamed CXXXV Mixed Engineer Battalion and assigned to the 135th Armored Cavalry Division "Ariete")
 IV Engineer Battalion
 X Engineer Battalion
 II Cableway Battalion
 VII Mixed Connections Battalion
 and many smaller units

The regiment was disbanded by invading German forces after the announcement of the Armistice of Cassibile on 8 September 1943.

Cold War 
At the beginning of the Cold War the Italian Army formed five fortification pioneers battalions, which were tasked with laying mine fields in front of the fortifications of the Alpine Wall fortifications that had been reactivated:

 I Fortification Pioneers Battalion, in Casarsa della Delizia - V Army Corps Engineer Command, formed on 1 September 1950, moved to Orcenico Superiore in 1951
 II Fortification Pioneers Battalion, in Conegliano - V Army Corps Engineer Command, formed on 1 May 1951
 III Fortification Pioneers Battalion, in Latisana - V Army Corps Engineer Command, formed on 1 May 1951
 IV Fortification Pioneers Battalion, in Bolzano - IV Army Corps Engineer Command, formed on 1 September 1953
 V Fortification Pioneers Battalion, in Sterzing - IV Army Corps]] Engineer Command, formed on 20 January 1954

On 1 April 1954 the 3rd Engineer Grouping was formed in Conegliano, which took command of the I, II, and III fortification pioneers battalions. On 1 July 1954 also the V Fortification Pioneers Battalion moved to Orcenico Superiore and joined the grouping. In 1955 the grouping was renamed 3rd Fortification Pioneers Regiment and moved from Conegliano to Orcenico Superiore. At the time the regiment also fielded a mechanics-electricians company and a water company. On 31 March 1964 the V Fortification Pioneers Battalion and the two companies were disbanded. On 1 October 1972 the I Fortification Pioneers Battalion was disbanded. On the same date the I and II battalions were renamed XXX respectively XXXI Fortification Sappers Battalion to commemorate the XXX Sappers Battalion and XXXI Sappers Battalion, which had distinguished themselves in World War II on the Eastern Front respectively during the Western Desert Campaign. Consequently the regiment changed its name to 3rd Fortification Sappers Regiment. 

During the 1975 army reform the army disbanded the regimental level and newly independent battalions were granted for the first time their own flags. During the reform engineer battalions were named for a lake if they supported a corps or named for a river if they supported a division or brigade. On 30 September 1975 the XXX Fortification Sappers Battalion was disbanded. On 31 December 1975 the regiment itself was disbanded and the next day the XXXI Fortification Sappers Battalion was renamed 3rd Sappers Battalion "Verbano" and assigned the flag and traditions of the 3rd Engineer Regiment. The battalion consisted of a command, a command and park company, and three sappers companies, which were numbered 30th, 31st, and 32nd. The battalion was assigned to the 3rd Army Corps' Engineer Command.

For its conduct and work after the 1976 Friuli earthquake the battalion was awarded a Bronze Medal of Army Valour, which was affixed to the battalion's flag. Due to the damage the battalion's base in Udine had suffered in the earthquake the battalion moved on 26 July 1976 from Orcenico Superiore to Udine.

In 1988 the command and park company split into a command and services company, and a special equipment company. On 31 August 1991 the battalion was disbanded and the next day the 3rd Engineer Regiment was reformed with the personnel and materiel of the disbanded battalion. On 1 December 2000 the 3rd Engineer Regiment joined the Cavalry Brigade "Pozzuolo del Friuli".

International missions 
The 3rd Engineers Regiment was deployed in 1992-1998 for Operation Sicilian Vespers and in the following international missions:

 Operation Pellicano
 Operation Joint Guardian
 Operation Ancient Babylon
 Operation Enduring Freedom
 United Nations Interim Force in Lebanon

Current structure 

As of 2022 the 3rd Engineer Regiment consists of:

  Regimental Command, in Udine
 5th Command and Logistic Support Company
 Sappers Battalion "Verbano"
 8th Deployment Support Company
 30th Sappers Company
 31st Amphibious Sappers Company
 32nd Amphibious Sappers Company

The Command and Logistic Support Company fields the following platoons: C3 Platoon, Transport and Materiel Platoon, Medical Platoon, Commissariat Platoon, and EOD Platoon. Each of the two sapper companies fields a Command Platoon, an Advanced Combat Reconnaissance Teams Platoon, and two sapper platoons. The Deployment Support Company and Mobility Support Company field the battalion's heavy military engineering vehicles: Biber bridgelayers, Dachs armored engineer vehicles, cranes, excavators, Medium Girder Bridges etc. The sapper companies and Command and Logistic Support Company are equipped with VTLM "Lince" and VTMM "Orso" vehicles.

See also 
 Cavalry Brigade "Pozzuolo del Friuli"

References

External links
Italian Army Website: 3° Reggimento Genio Guastatori

Military units and formations established in 1926
Military units and formations disestablished in 1943
Military units and formations established in 1954
Military units and formations disestablished in 1975
Military units and formations established in 1992
Engineer Regiments of Italy